Bangladesh participated at the 16th Asian Games in Guangzhou, China.

Medalists

Archery

Men

Women

Athletics

Men
Track and road events

Women
Track and road events

Board games

Chess

Boxing

Men

Cricket

Men

Team
Mohammad AshrafulShamsur RahmanNaeem IslamFaisal HossainShahadat HossainMahbubul AlamNazmul HossainMohammed NazimuddinSuhrawadi ShuvoDolar MahmudMithun AliNasir HossainRony TalukdarShuvagoto HomSabbir Rahman

 Three of the four ICC Full Members in Asia, Bangladesh, Pakistan and Sri Lanka as well as Afghanistan who played in the 2010 ICC World Twenty20 directly entered the quarterfinals.

Quarterfinals

Semifinals

Final

Women

Team
Rumana AhmedSalma KhatunShohaly AkhterAyesha AkhterChamely KhatunTithy Rani SarkarPanna GhoshSultana Yesmin BoishakhiLata MondolTazia AkhterSuktara RahmanJahanara AlamChampa ChakmaSathira Jakir JesyFarzana Hoque Pinky

Pool B

Semifinals

Final

Cue sports

Men

Football

Men

Muhammed Mazharul Islam
Mohamed Marouf Ahmed
Sakil Mia Chawdhury

Golf

Men

Hockey

Men

Team

Md. Maksud Alam
Taposh Barmon
Md.Mosiur Rahman Biplob
Mdmamunur Rahman Chayan
Md.Musharrof Hossain Kuti
Md.Zahid Hossain
Md.Rafiqul Islam
Md Enamul Kabir
A.H.M Kamruzzaman
Pushkor Khisa
Krishno Kumir
Rashel Mahamud
Sheikh Md. Nannu
Md.Imran Hasan Pinto
Md.Imran Ahamed Riaz
Md. Hosney Mobarok Sumon

Men's team will participate in Group B of the hockey tournament.

Group B

Classification 5th–8th

Classification 7th–8th

Kabaddi

Men

Team

Razu Ahmed
Md. Mozammel Haque
Md. Maftun Haque
Md Faruk Hasan
Md. Mosharrof Hossain
Mokterul Islam
Md.safikulislam Matubber
Md.aruduzzaman Munshi
Abu Saleh Musa
Md Bozlur Rashid
Md Rokonnuzzaman
Mohammad Tipu Sultan

Men's team will participate in Group B of the kabbibi tournament.

Preliminary round

Group B

Women

Team

Hena Akhter
Rupali Akhter
Kazi Shahin Ara
Farzana Akhter Baby
Juni Chakma
Shahnaz Parvin Maleka
Kochi Rani Mondal
Ismat Ara Nishi
Maleka Parvin
Fatema Akhter Poly
Sharmin Sultana Rima
Dolly Shefali

Women's team will participate in Group B of the Kabaddi tournament.

Preliminary round

Group B

Knockout round

Semifinals

FINAL RANK:

Karate

Men

Women

Shooting

Men

Women

Swimming

Men

Women

Taekwondo

Men

Women

Weightlifting

Wushu

Men
Changquan

Nanquan\Nangun

Women
Sanshou

See also
 Bangladesh at the Asian Games
 Bangladesh at the Olympics

References

Nations at the 2010 Asian Games
2010
Asian Games